Minnetonka Cave is one of the larger limestone caves in the state of Idaho.  It is located in Caribou National Forest in Bear Lake County, Idaho, United States, above the village of St. Charles (located at the north end of Bear Lake). “Minnetonka” is a misunderstanding of the words Mni and Tanka, derived from one of three Indigenous dialects: Dakota, Lakota or Nakota. “Mni Tanka”, pronounced (Mini-Tah-“nasal n”-Kah) translates into “Big/Large Water”. Tours through the cave are offered from Memorial Day (weather permitting) through Labor Day by Aud-Di Recreational Services, the concessionaire that holds the special use permit from the United States Forest Service. The half-mile route through the cave is lined with stalactites and stalagmites.

The cave is a hibernaculum to five different species of bats. One species, the Townsend's Big-eared Bat (Corynorhinus townsendii), while not on the endangered species list is on the lists of both the State of Idaho and the Forest Service as a species of concern.

References

External links

Bearlake visitors bureau
Scenic Canyons - Photos and tour information
Backcountry Secrets: Minnetonka Cave Idaho coordinates

Landforms of Bear Lake County, Idaho
Caves of Idaho
Limestone caves
Show caves in the United States
Tourist attractions in Bear Lake County, Idaho